The Electricity sector in Malaysia ranges from generation, transmission, distribution and sales of electricity in the country.

Regulators

Electricity in Malaysia is regulated by:
 Tenaga Nasional for Peninsular Malaysia
 Sarawak Energy for Sarawak
 Sabah Electricity for Sabah and Labuan

Generation

Installed capacity
The installed capacity in Peninsular Malaysia in 2014 was 8,636 MW.

Power generation
Power generation in Peninsular Malaysia in 2014 came from natural gas (53.8%), coal (35.3%), hydropower (10.3%), distillates (0.6%) and MFO (0.04%).

Power stations

Transmission and distribution

Transmission

Interconnection
Power grid in Malaysia is interconnected to Singapore and Thailand.

Load

Peak load
The peak load in Peninsular Malaysia in 2014 was 16,901 MW.

See also
 Energy policy of Malaysia

References

External links
 

Electric power in Malaysia